Filmworks XV: Protocols of Zion features a score by John Zorn for a documentary film by Marc Levin. The album was released on Zorn's own label, Tzadik Records, in 2005 and contains music that Zorn wrote and recorded for, Protocols of Zion (2005), a documentary detailing the rise of anti-semitism following the September 11 attacks.

Reception
The Allmusic review by Thom Jurek awarded the album 4 stars stating "this is a provocative record for all the ease of listening it affords. It's a John Zorn who is not heard nearly often enough. This music is adventurous but contains no edges; it is deeply emotional, wonderfully warm, and utterly engaging".

Track listing
 "Protocols of Zion"                        -                   4:27
 "Searching For a Past"                     -                   5:22
 "Jew Watcher"                              -                   2:43
 "Mystery of the Jew"                       -                   4:09
 "History Repeats Itself"                   -                   2:14
 "Arab and Jew"                             -                   5:57
 "Fighting Time"                            -                   5:02
 "Hollywood/Rikers"                         -                   2:36
 "Elders of Zion"                           -                   5:26
 "A Dark Future"                           -                   4:31
 "Transition 1"                            -                   0:31
 "Transition 2"                            -                   0:17
 "Transition 3"                            -                   0:30
 "Transition 4"                            -                   0:25
 "Coda - The Metaphysics of Anti-Semitism" -                   1:46

All music by John Zorn
Recorded at Frank Booth, Brooklyn (New York) in October 2004.
Produced by John Zorn.

Personnel
John Zorn – electric pianos
Shanir Ezra Blumenkranz – bass, oud
Cyro Baptista – percussion

References

Tzadik Records soundtracks
Albums produced by John Zorn
John Zorn soundtracks
2005 soundtrack albums
Film scores